Nils Collett Vogt (1864–1937) was a Norwegian poet. Below is a list of his works, sorted chronologically by year of publication.

Poetry
 Digt, 1887.
 Fra Vaar til Høst, 1894.
 Musik og Vaar, 1896.
 Det dyre Brød, 1900.
 Fra Kristiania, 1904.
 Septemberbrand, 1907.
 Digte i udvalg, 1908.
 Hjemkomst, 1917.
 Ned fra Bjerget, 1924.
 Vind og Bølge, 1927.
 Et liv i dikt, 1930.

Fiction
 Familiens sorg, novel, 1889.
 Harriet Blich, narrative, 1902
 Mennesker, novels, 1903.
 Paa reise: skildringer fra ind- og udland, 1907.
 Smaa breve fra Finnmarken, 1918.
 Levende og døde, essays, 1922.
 Fra gutt til mann, autobiography, 1932.
 Oplevelser, autobiography, 1934.

Drama
 To mennesker, 1904.
 Naar Musikken dør: Skuespil i fire Akter, 1909.
 Spændte sind; to skuespil, 1910.
 Moren, 1913.
 Therese, 1914.
 De Skadeskudte, 1916.
 Karneval, 1920.
 Forbi er forbi, 1929.

References

Bibliographies by writer